Arterial gas may refer to:
 Physiologic arterial blood gas 
Air embolism